is a Japanese coming-of-age manga series written and illustrated by Kazuhiko Shimamoto. It was serialized in Shogakukan's seinen manga magazine Weekly Young Sunday from March 2007 to July 2008, when the magazine ceased its publication; a chapter was published in YS Special in October 2008, before being transferred to Shogakukan's then-brand-new shōnen manga magazine Monthly Shōnen Sunday in May 2009. Aoi Honō is a fictionalized account of Shimamoto's time as a student at the Osaka University of Arts, which he attended alongside Hideaki Anno, Hiroyuki Yamaga, and Takami Akai.

It was adapted into a live-action Japanese television drama, titled Blue Fire in English, that aired from July to October 2014. The drama was streamed on Viki with English subtitles.

Cast
Yūya Yagira – Moyuru Honō
Ken Yasuda – Hideaki Anno
Tsuyoshi Muro – Hiroyuki Yamaga
Tomoya Nakamura – Takami Akai
Mizuki Yamamoto – Tonko Morinaga
Yuina Kuroshima – Hiromi Tsuda
Kaname Endō – Masahiko Minami
Gaku Hamada – Toshio Okada
Kenji Urai – Kentarō Yano
Yui Ichikawa – Jun Iwase
Haruna Kojima – Masumi
Seika Taketomi – Miyuki
Jirō Satō – MAD Holy
Anna Kon'no – Rumiko Takahashi
Toshio Okada – Osamu Tezuka

Voice
Tōru Furuya – Narrator and Katsuya Niimi (Nine)
Hiromi Tsuru – Yuri Nakao (Nine)
Makio Inoue – Captain Harlock (Space Pirate Captain Harlock)
Masako Nozawa – Tetsuro (Galaxy Express 999)
Masako Ikeda – Maetel (Galaxy Express 999)
 – Joe Yabuki (Ashita no Joe)
 – Yōko Shiraki (Ashita no Joe)
Katsumi Toriumi – Masato Wakamatsu (Miyuki)
Ryōtarō Okiayu – Jun Kenzaki (Ring ni Kakero)
Kappei Yamaguchi – Nobotta Ōyama (Otoko Oidon)

Media

Manga
Aoi Honō is written and illustrated by Kazuhiko Shimamoto. The manga debuted in Shogakukan's seinen manga magazine Weekly Young Sunday on March 8, 2007. After the magazine ceased publication on July 31, 2008, a chapter of  Aoi Honō was published the Big Comic Spirits special supplementary issue YS Special in October 2008. The series was then transferred to the brand new shōnen manga magazine Monthly Shōnen Sunday on May 12, 2009. Shogakukan has collected its chapters into individual tankōbon volumes. The first volume was released on February 5, 2008. As of August 10, 2022, twenty-seven volumes have been released.

Volume list

Reception
Volume 2 sold 24,521 copies by May 17, 2009, volume 9 sold 20,415 copies by November 18, 2012, and volume 10 sold 17,068 copies by June 16, 2013.

Aoi Honō was one of the Jury Recommended Works in the Story Manga division at the 13th Japan Media Arts Festival Awards in 2009. In 2010, the manga received 23 points in the 3rd Manga Taishō, placing last among the ten nominees. The manga received Excellence Award of the Manga Division at the 18th Japan Media Arts Festival Awards in 2014. In 2015, along with Asahinagu, it won the 60th Shogakukan Manga Award in the General category. In February 2015, Asahi Shimbun announced that Aoi Honō was one of nine nominees for the nineteenth annual Tezuka Osamu Cultural Prize.

Notes

References

External links
  
  
 

2014 Japanese television series debuts
2014 Japanese television series endings
Coming-of-age anime and manga
Manga adapted into television series
Seinen manga
Shogakukan manga
Shōnen manga
Television shows set in Osaka
Television shows written by Yûichi Fukuda
TV Tokyo original programming
Winners of the Shogakukan Manga Award for general manga